Since September 2018, allegations of an ouster plot against Rodrigo Duterte, the President of the Philippines, have been publicized by the military, who mainly implicated opposition figures and critics of the Duterte administration of involving in the plot. Several opposition groups who have been tagged heavily criticized their inclusion and subsequently denied the involvement in the plots.

"Red October" plot 

"Red October" is an alleged plot that was announced by the Armed Forces of the Philippines (AFP) on September 24, 2018, who said that the Communist Party of the Philippines (CPP), opposition parties such as Liberal Party (LP) and the coalation of Tindig Pilipinas were behind the planning of the ouster plot. One of the opposition being mentioned about the involvement is ousted Chief Justice Maria Lourdes Sereno, who subsequently denied the ousting or removal of the President. Robredo made a statement on September 25, 2018, saying that linking the opposition to an ouster plot was a tactic used in during Martial law and the claim was baseless. She and Senator Antonio Trillanes denied the plot involvement. The Philippine National Police doubted about the plot. The Makabayan bloc denied the involvement in the plot, although they admitted that they will hold a massive rally the next month. Department of Labor and Employment Secretary Silvestre Bello III said that the plot is just hearsay and he added that ousting the President is impossible as Duterte is being given a strong support by the people.

On September 25, the NBI and Philippine Army raided a farm house in Teresa, Rizal where they arrested a Chinese national Lily Ong and confiscated the high-calibre guns. According to the NBI spokesperson Ferdinand Lavin, they have no evidence proving that Ong and the confiscated guns are connected to the New People's Army (NPA), as well as the "Red October" plot. However, AFP spokesperson Brigadier General Edgard Arevalo said that Ong is connected to the rebel groups and she used the farm house as a hideout for NPA members.

On October 4, the AFP provided the list of schools which were allegedly involved the plot: Shortly after the list has emerged, representatives of the mentioned schools slammed AFP for being included in their plot, with some calling it "baseless and dangerous". The CPP denied the existence of the plot.

On October 18, PNP chief Oscar Albayalde said that the Lumad leaders, whom he met, claimed that the communist rebels were recruiting students in Lumad schools.

"Bikoy" videos  
On April 3, 2019, a series of video was uploaded by the account named "Totoong Narco-list" on YouTube, accusing Paolo Duterte, son of incumbent Philippine President Rodrigo Duterte, for receiving money from a crime syndicate and using the brother of his brother-in-law as a dummy for the transactions. The video shows the hooded-figure calling himself as "Bikoy" claiming that he worked for drug syndicates and "handled transaction records." He presents the documents showing the multi-million bank transfers allegedly owned by Paolo Duterte and Waldo Carpio (brother of Sara Duterte's husband Manases Carpio). At the end of the video, "Bikoy" claimed that Paolo has a dragon tattoo on his back. A document "Bikoy" presented, called a "tara," is shown – "supposedly an internal document that lists down how much money is given to the "principals" or leaders of the drug syndicate."

Presidential Spokesperson Salvador Panelo dismissed the video as black propaganda. On April 4, President Duterte blamed the opposition party, which he called "yellows", saying that they are behind of making the video. Senator Antonio Trillanes praised the content of the video. Trillanes also challenged Paolo Duterte to show his back tattoo, but Paolo refuses to do so.

On April 10, another video entitled "Ang Totoong Narco List - Episode 3" was uploaded on YouTube, this time implicates senatorial candidate Bong Go, whom "Bikoy" claimed that Go is involved in an illegal drug trade and also has a dragon tattoo on his back allegedly "containing the alphanumeric code of his drug transactions." Go dismisses the video as a "clear" black propaganda against him and the administration. To prove that he has no dragon tattoo, Go took off his shirt to the media, showing his back. Go again showed off his back on May 6. On April 17, Department of Justice (DOJ) Secretary Menardo Guevarra had ordered the National Bureau of Investigation (NBI) to begin the investigation into the video.

On April 30, the NBI arrested Rodel Jayme at his home upon the orders of Makati Regional Trial Court for sharing the "Bikoy" videos. Jayme was charged for "inciting to sedition" by the DOJ. He said that he only created the website, MetroBalita.net, hosting the anti-Duterte videos but denied that he was responsible for its content. Liberal Party (LP) has denied the involvement of sharing the "Bikoy" videos. On May 3, Jayme said that he is ready to become a "state witness" to name the person behind the videos. He also admitted that he supports LP and he has a photo of him and Vice President Leni Robredo – which has since been spread online by opposition critics.

On May 6, a man named Peter Joemel Advincula claiming to be the hooded-figure "Bikoy" surfaces on the public. In a press conference held at the Integrated Bar of the Philippines (IBP), Advincula asked for legal assistance to sue Paolo Duterte and Bong Go and also denied the links of any political position or LP politicians. Advincula reiterated his statements that Paolo Duterte, Go and others are part of a drug syndicate operating in Misibis Bay, Albay.

On May 7, Senator Antonio Trillanes and Magdalo Representative Gary Alejano rejected the allegations that they have ties with Jayme. On May 8, Senate President Tito Sotto said that, in 2016, Advincula had made the same accusations against the officials of then-Aquino administration. A sworn statement claimed that then-President Benigno Aquino III, Interior Secretary Mar Roxas, Justice Secretary Leila de Lima "were patrons of the "Quadrangle" drug syndicate." Prior to this, in 2012, according to Advincula, he was sued for estafa and was given a 6-year jail sentence but was released four years later for good behavior. Following Sotto's revelation, Senator Panfilo Lacson has canceled a Senate committee hearing on Advincula's allegations. On May 8, the IBP declined Advincula's request for legal assistance to sue Duterte and Go. Guevarra has issued an ultimatum to Advincula to surrender to the NBI, otherwise he will be charged with "inciting to sedition" like Jayme.

"Bikoy's" allegations against Liberal Party and other opposition members 
On May 23, Advincula surrendered to the Camp Crame, where he retracted the statement by claiming to the public that the videos were "orchestrated" by LP and Senator Trillanes. He also said that he is vowed to receive  in exchange of being there in the video. Advincula said that the statement in the five episodes were all scripted. The script was allegedly prepared by Trillanes and LP members in an effort to sabotage the administration-backed senatorial candidates (from Hugpong ng Pagbabago (HNP)) in the 2019 elections – this proved to be fruitless when most of the HNP candidates won the seat and none of the opposition senatorial candidates from Otso Diretso have made it to the winning circle.

Because of his accomplishments, Advincula issued an apology to Duterte family. He denied that Go–who won a Senate seat in the May 13 election–has a dragon tattoo on his back contrary to the previous statement that he has. Advincula launched the project called "Project Sodoma" in which goal is to overthrow Duterte from the office, assume Vice President Leni Robredo in that position and Trillanes as Vice President. The project also implicated other senators such as Risa Hontiveros and Leila de Lima.

Robredo and members of the opposition party have denied the allegations from Advincula. LP President Kiko Pangilinan, however, suspected that the administration might have threatened Advincula into retracting his statement. Opposition figures such as Trillanes and Robredo questioned the credibility of Advincula. Davao City Mayor Sara Duterte issued a statement, saying that "Bikoy" is a "scam created by people who oppose the Duterte administration." Senator Risa Hontiveros made a statement, saying that "Bikoy" exposé is "absurd" and his surrender is the "product of Malacanang's 'wild imagination.'" However, Defense Secretary Delfin Lorenzana urged the public not to believe Advincula's statement and he also suspected that his motivation is to  "save himself."

On May 25, Presidential Spokesperson Salvador Panelo said that Trillanes may soon face another imprisonment following Advincula's tagging of the latter as the mastermind of producing the videos.

During a Senate hearing on May 27, the Philippine National Police (PNP) began investigating Advincula's claims as well as the alleged involvement of Trillanes and LP members. Trillanes denied Advincula's allegations of ousting the President. Trillanes also revealed that he met Advincula in August 2018, along with other priests; Advincula said that he sought refuge to the church as the syndicates who are involved in the illegal drug trade were followed him to "liquidate" him. However, after listening to Advincula, he found the ambiguity in Advincula's story, prompting Trillanes to set it aside. By February 2019, the priests approached him and presented the documents supposedly containing the bank transactions of drug syndicates. He, however, advised them to wait for the validation from the local and international groups. By the time the series of "Bikoy" videos emerged on YouTube, Trillanes was in abroad at the time where he denied the involvement in producing the videos.

On June 7, 2019, Caloocan Bishop Pablo Virgilio David stated that he had met briefly with Advincula on February 9, 2019 but denied the latter's claim of Trillanes meeting with the former. On the same day, a report from the PTV stated that Advincula had submitted his sworn affidavit to the police. According to his affidavit, Advincula had met the certain priest, Fr. Ruben Reyes, due to financial problems in Bicol Region, to the point where he is vowed for a job with a salary of 25,000 every month. It was revealed that Fr. Albert Alejo told Advincula to call his cover name "Bikoy". Aside from vowed to receive 500,000 allegedly from Senator Trillanes, Trillanes had used the code name "Stella" as a "payment for his service".

On June 7, 2019, a report from PTV stated that Advincula had submitted his sworn affidavit to the police. According to his affidavit, Advincula had met the certain priest, Fr. Ruben Reyes, due to financial problems in Bicol Region, to the point where he is vowed for a job with a salary of 25,000 every month. When Advincula is being questioned why the nickname "Bikoy" called him, at which Advincula said that a priest, Fr. Albert Alejo, told Advincula to call his name "Bikoy" ever since. Aside from vowed to receive 500,000 allegedly from Senator Trillanes, Trillanes had used the code name "Stella" as a "payment for his service". The affidavit also stated that, on March 4, 2019, Advincula had a meeting with the Otso Diretso candidates (except Mar Roxas), up to the point where the first episode of the video had started. The affidavit, however, is yet to be validated by the police.

Charges by the CIDG 

On July 19, 2019, the PNP–Criminal Investigation and Detection Group (CIDG) filed charges against Vice President Robredo, all members (but Mar Roxas) of Otso Diretso and other members of opposition members for "sedition, cyber libel, libel, estafa, harboring a criminal, and obstruction of justice". De Lima, Robredo, bishops and other opposition figures who were tagged in the case criticized the PNP for being charged based on allegations. Former Senator Antonio Trillanes claimed the charges against him were political persecution and harassment by the Duterte administration.

On July 23, ABS-CBN News reported that the Office of the Solicitor General (OSG) had been involved in drafting the affidavit of Advincula. Advincula's lawyer, Larry Gadon, insisted that he created the affidavit alone. Gadon also stated that he is in favor to impeach Robredo should the latter indicted in the case. On July 27, the DOJ announced that the preliminary investigation will be conducted on August 9, 2019 on the sedition complaint filed against the above-mentioned person. On the same day, a group called "Team Pilipinas" came to DOJ headquarters to call Guevara to junk the complaint against Robredo.

On August 20, Solicitor General Jose Calida revealed that the videos were published through the server of Ateneo de Manila University (ADMU).

"Oust Duterte" matrix 
On April 22, 2019, President Duterte released to the public the diagram called "Oust Duterte matrix", which containing the destabilization efforts by media organizations and journalists against him. The details about the alleged ouster plot was first published by The Manila Times chairman emeritus Dante Ang. On the same day, according to Presidential Spokesperson Salvador Panelo, the source of the matrix is from the Duterte himself. Among the organizations included in the matrix are Ellen Tordesillas of Vera Files, online news site Rappler, Philippine Center for Investigative Journalism (PCIJ), and lawyer group National Union of Peoples' Lawyers (NUPL) — all of them are critical of the Duterte administration. It also includes the name only known as "Bikoy", the hooded-figure in the viral video accusing some members of the Duterte family involving in a drug syndicate. Malacañang said that they will not press charges against the media which tagged in the ouster plot. The Armed Forces of the Philippines and the Philippine National Police stated that they did not find any credible plot to oust Duterte. President Duterte's daughter, Sara Duterte, also expressed her doubt on the authenticity and accuracy of the matrix.

On May 1, Panelo said that proving the ouster matrix is "totally unnecessary." However, on May 2, Panelo retracted the April 22 statement, saying he got the source of the matrix via text message from "somebody" and denied that Duterte done anything in the matrix. Panelo also claimed that that Office of the President was relayed to Dante Ang. The next day, Panelo insisted that he never changed his statement.

On May 8, Malacañang released another diagram, this time accusing Liberal Party and Magdalo Group of conspiring to remove Duterte from office. Panelo said that the President Duterte "himself has received intelligence information" and that conspiracy also includes the media. The personalities linked to the conspiracy includes Otso Diretso senatorial candidates, Senator Antonio Trillanes, former Presidential Spokesperson Edwin Lacierda and even also included Communist leader Jose Maria Sison, Rio Olympics silver medalist Hidilyn Diaz, and television host Gretchen Ho. Their names in the matrix claimed to have a "collaboration" with Rodel Jayme, who was arrested on April 30 for sharing the "Totoong Narco-list" videos featuring hooded-figure "Bikoy" – whose identity was claimed by Peter Joemel Advincula to the public on May 6. Duterte said that he has no plans to file charges against the personalities and groups included in the matrix.

The diagrams were criticized by numerous personalities. Hidilyn Diaz, who was included in the matrix, criticized the inclusion of her name as she was preparing for the upcoming Tokyo 2020 Olympics. Diaz denied the acquaintance of Rodel Jayme. Ho said that she was surprised to see her name and also noted that she mainly focuses reporting about lifestyle and sports, not the reports that could be deem "destabilizing." The organizations and journalists named in the matrix also criticized it. They allege that the matrix was a way harassment by the Palace against journalists and organization who have criticized the war on drugs. Maria Ressa made a similar statement and also called the matrix "another Palace ploy to harass journalists."

A picture of Panelo holding the diagram was turned into a meme endorsing the opposition candidates for the 2019 Philippine Senate election. He denounced it in an official statement as a "malicious use of his image for black propaganda and political mudslinging".

See also 
 Protests against Rodrigo Duterte

References

External links 
 "TIMELINE: The 'Bikoy' controversy". Rappler.

Allegations
2019 in the Philippines
2019 in politics
2019 controversies
Presidency of Rodrigo Duterte